Mike Jones Jr. is an American politician from the state of Alabama. He currently serves as a member of the Alabama House of Representatives for District 92. He belongs to the Republican Party.

Career 
Jones began his career as an attorney with South Alabama Law in 1994 with a concentration in family law after graduating from the University of Alabama with a JD in 1992. He began his political career in 2000, when he became a councilman in the city of Andalusia, Alabama. In 2004, he began a stint as the Mayor Pro Tempore of Andalusia which lasted until 2008. Professionally, he was a city judge in Andalusia and a special circuit judge with the Covington County Judiciary. In 2009, Jones announced his candidacy for the Alabama State House for District 92. He defeated Greg White in the 2010 Republican primary with 63% of the vote. In November 2010, Jones defeated both Democrat David Darby and Independent candidate Don Cotton with 52.1% of the vote. In 2014, he was unopposed in both the Republican primary and the general election. In 2018, he was unopposed in the Republican party, and he won the general election with 99.2% of the vote. In 2022, Jones ran in the Republican primary for the Alabama State Senate District 31 race. He was defeated by Coffee County Commissioner Josh Carney.

Committee Positions 
Jones served as the chair of the House Rules Committee in the 2019 and 2021 legislative sessions.

Education 
As a child of a teacher in the public school system, Jones grew up in Covington County Schools. After graduating high school in 1985, Jones enrolled in Lurleen B. Wallace Jr. College. He graduated in 1987 with an A.S. in Chemistry. He then enrolled in Birmingham-Southern College. He graduated in 1989 in a B.S. in Political Science and Government. Jones then attended the University of Alabama Law. He graduated with a J.D. in 1992.

Elections

Alabama House of Representatives District 92

Alabama State Senate District 31

References 

Republican Party members of the Alabama House of Representatives
21st-century American politicians
Living people
1966 births
University of Alabama alumni
Covington County, Alabama